The Idolmaker is a 1980 American musical drama starring Ray Sharkey, Peter Gallagher, Paul Land, Tovah Feldshuh and Joe Pantoliano.

The film is loosely based on the life of rock promoter/producer Bob Marcucci who discovered, among others, Frankie Avalon and Fabian. Directed by Academy Award winning filmmaker Taylor Hackford and written by Edward di Lorenzo, The Idolmaker was the feature film debut of Peter Gallagher, Joe Pantoliano, and Paul Land. Bob Marcucci served as a technical advisor for the production.

Plot 
Set in 1959, Vincent "Vinnie" Vacarri (Ray Sharkey), a Brooklyn-based songwriter pursues success in the fledgling rock 'n' roll music business, along with his best friend and piano accompanist Gino "G.G." Pilato (Joe Pantoliano). After being impressed by a charismatic local saxophone player, Tomaso DeLorusso (Paul Land), Vinnie convinces him to trade his instrument for a microphone and over the next few months, under Vinnie's strict guidance, the newly named "Tommy Dee" becomes a rock 'n' roll sensation.

Searching for continued success, Vinnie prepares another act in the form of Guido (Peter Gallagher), a local teen busboy, prompting a jealous and arrogant Tommy Dee to abandon him for a new manager. With even more gusto and single-mindedness, Vinnie embarks on a destructive journey to control every aspect of his new act's image.

Despite his obvious flair for creating teen idols, Vinnie's girlfriend, Brenda (Tovah Feldshuh), a successful teen magazine editor, is concerned that his obsession is destroying everyone around him, including himself.

Cast
 Ray Sharkey as Vincent "Vinnie" Vacarri
 Peter Gallagher as Guido/Caesare
 Tovah Feldshuh as	Brenda Roberts
 Joe Pantoliano as Gino "G.G." Pilato
 Paul Land as Tomaso "Tommy Dee" DeLorusso
 Maureen McCormick as Ellen Fields
 Olympia Dukakis as Mrs. Vacarri
 John Aprea as Pani Vacarri

Production
Marcucci approached producer Gene Kirkwood with the idea for the film. In the original script, the singers were more sympathetic and the producer less so.

Soundtrack
The film features an original music score by Jeff Barry and choreography by Deney Terrio.

Track listing for the soundtrack
 "Here Is My Love" (Jesse Frederick)
 "Ooo-Wee Baby" (Darlene Love)
 "Come and Get It" (Nino Tempo)
 "Sweet Little Lover" (Jesse Frederick)
 "I Can't Tell" (Colleen Fitzpatrick)
 "However Dark the Night" (Peter Gallagher)
 "Baby" (Peter Gallagher)
 "I Know Where You're Going" (Nino Tempo)
 "A Boy and a Girl" (The Sweet Inspirations and The London Fog)
 "I Believe It Can Be Done" (Ray Sharkey)
 "I Believe It Can Be Done" (Instrumental) (Nino Tempo)

Charts

Home media
On August 27, 2013, Shout! Factory released The Idolmaker on Blu-ray.

Lawsuit

Fabian Forte filed a $64 million lawsuit against the film, alleging defamation and invasion of privacy. Forte, a teen idol of the late 1950s and early 1960s, had been managed by Bob Marcucci. Having served as the inspiration for the character of Guido/Caesare, Forte claimed the film made him look like "a totally manufactured singer, a mere pretty face without any singing ability or acting talent." He went on to say they settled out of court, requiring he, his wife, and family receive apologies in The Hollywood Reporter and Variety, and Marcucci's 7.5% ownership of the film passed to Forte.

Plans for remake

In 2014, Variety reported that a remake of the film was in the works, with Craig Brewer to direct, and Justin Timberlake to produce (along with the two producers of the original film, Hawk Koch and Gene Kirkwood). The remake never materialized.

Awards and nominations

References

External links
 
 
 TCM.com

1980 films
1980s musical films
American musical films
Films directed by Taylor Hackford
Films featuring a Best Musical or Comedy Actor Golden Globe winning performance
United Artists films
Films à clef
1980 directorial debut films
1980s English-language films
1980s American films